Thymopentin is an immunostimulant. As such, it has been used in several clinical studies in the early years of the AIDS pandemic (from 1983 to 1985). Thymopentin helped to improve immunological condition in several patients for a brief time under specific treatments.

It interacts with T cells.

It is a thymic polypeptide.

References

Peptides
Immunostimulants